Zdravko Šaraba (born 15 May 1980) is a Bosnian-Herzegovinian former footballer defender.

Club career
He won the 2002–03 Premier League of Bosnia and Herzegovina with hometown club FK Leotar Trebinje.

In January 2009 he moved from FK Sarajevo of the Premier League of Bosnia and Herzegovina to Belarusian FC Dinamo Minsk.

International career
He played one match for the Bosnia and Herzegovina national football team, coming on as a second-half substitute for Nikola Mikelini in a November 2008 friendly match away against Slovenia.

See also
List of NK Maribor players

References

External links

2010-11 season stats at BiHsoccer.

1980 births
Living people
People from Trebinje
Serbs of Bosnia and Herzegovina
Association football central defenders
Bosnia and Herzegovina footballers
Bosnia and Herzegovina international footballers
FK Leotar players
FC Volyn Lutsk players
FK Sarajevo players
NK Maribor players
FC Dinamo Minsk players
FK Laktaši players
Premier League of Bosnia and Herzegovina players
Ukrainian Premier League players
Slovenian PrvaLiga players
Belarusian Premier League players
Bosnia and Herzegovina expatriate footballers
Expatriate footballers in Ukraine
Bosnia and Herzegovina expatriate sportspeople in Ukraine
Expatriate footballers in Slovenia
Bosnia and Herzegovina expatriate sportspeople in Slovenia
Expatriate footballers in Belarus
Bosnia and Herzegovina expatriate sportspeople in Belarus